Dresselhaus may refer to:
Dresselhaus effect, a case of spin-orbit coupling in crystalline solids

People 
 Gene Dresselhaus (1929–2021), American solid-state physicist, discoverer of the Dresselhaus effect, spouse of Mildred Dresselhaus
 Mildred Dresselhaus (née Spiewak; 1930–2017), American physicist particularly known for research on carbon nanomaterials, spouse of Gene Dresselhaus